Rudolf Kehrer (10 July 1923 – 29 October 2013; surname also spelled Kerer) was a much-recorded Soviet and Russian classical pianist.

Biography
Kehrer was born in Tiflis, Georgia (later Tbilisi, Georgia) to a family of piano-makers who had emigrated from Swabia. He was a solo pianist of the Moscow Philharmonic Orchestra and professor at the Tchaikovsky Conservatory. In 1961, he won the All-Union Contest. Kehrer was long known only in Eastern bloc countries, as he was denied the opportunity to travel freely. His recording career lasted for over 40 years (1961–2001) in many diverse locations.

Kehrer last lived in Berlin and died in that city on October 29, 2013, at the age of 90.

References

External links
 
 

1923 births
2013 deaths
Musicians from Tbilisi
Soviet classical pianists
20th-century classical pianists
Soviet people of German descent
Expatriates from Georgia (country) in Switzerland